The Magic is the thirteenth studio album by Deerhoof, released in June 2016 through Polyvinyl.

Production
In April 2016, Deerhoof announced The Magic, its first studio album since their 2014 La Isla Bonita.

Joseph Baughman created the music video for the album's "The Devil and his Anarchic Surrealist Retinue". Baughman described his style as a slow-motion improvisation. The clay animated video features chessboard pieces and multicolored minotaurs. Gary McQuiggin created the video for "Dispossessor", featuring Professor Raphael Appleblossom (eccentric alter ego of author Matthew Watkins) "demonstrating" the Banach-Tarski Paradox.

Critical reception

The album received "generally favorable" reviews, according to review aggregator Metacritic. Exclaim!'s Anna Alger was extremely positive, writing that the album "finds the wholly original and ever-engaging band at their most cohesive and versatile — which is saying a lot, given their dynamic history."

Track listing

References

2016 albums
Deerhoof albums
Polyvinyl Record Co. albums